The 2015–16 St. Bonaventure Bonnies men's basketball team represented St. Bonaventure University during the 2015–16 NCAA Division I men's basketball season. The Bonnies, led by ninth year head coach Mark Schmidt, played their home games at the Reilly Center and were members of the Atlantic 10 Conference. They finished the season 22–9, 14–4 in A-10 play to finish in a three-way tie for the regular season championship. They lost in the quarterfinals of the A-10 tournament to Davidson. While the two other teams who tied with Saint Bonaventure for the A-10 title received at-large bids to the NCAA tournament, the Bonnies were one of the "First Four Out" and instead received a top seed in the National Invitation Tournament where they lost in the first round to Wagner.

Previous season
The Bonnies finished the 2014–15 season 18–13, 10–8 in A-10 play to finish in a three-way tie for sixth place. They advanced to the quarterfinals of the A-10 tournament where they lost to Dayton. For the second consecutive year, the Bonnies accumulated a winning record but did not receive an invite the postseason; the team failed to receive a bid to the National Invitation Tournament and, in accordance with school policy, preemptively ruled out participating in either the College Basketball Invitational or CollegeInsider.com Postseason Tournament.

Departures

Incoming transfers

Incoming recruits

Roster

Schedule

|-
!colspan=9 style=|  Exhibition

|-
!colspan=9 style=|  Non-conference regular season

|-
!colspan=12 style=| Atlantic 10 regular season

|-
!colspan=9 style=| Atlantic 10 tournament

|-
!colspan=9 style=| NIT

See also
 2015–16 St. Bonaventure Bonnies women's basketball team

References

St. Bonaventure Bonnies men's basketball seasons
St. Bonaventure
St. Bonaventure